Nukkuu is the second album by Lau Nau, released in 2008. 'Nukkuu' is Finnish for 'sleeps.' The songs are sung in Finnish, with English translations available on the back of physical albums.

Track listing
"Lue kartalta" – 4:29
"Painovoimaa, valoa" – 5:00
"Ruususuu" – 4:13
"Rubiinilasia" – 5:04
"Lähtölaulu" – 4:41
"Maapähkinäpuu" – 5:58
"Mooste" – 1:53
"Jouhet" – 4:30
"Vuoren laelle" – 4:37

2008 albums